The Open Energy Modelling Initiative (openmod) is a grassroots community of energy system modellers from universities and research institutes across Europe and elsewhere.  The initiative promotes the use of open-source software and open data in energy system modelling for research and policy advice.  The Open Energy Modelling Initiative documents a variety of open-source energy models and addresses practical and conceptual issues regarding their development and application.  The initiative runs an email list, an internet forum, and a wiki and hosts occasional academic workshops.  A statement of aims is available.

Context 

The application of open-source development to energy modelling dates back to around 2003.  This section provides some background for the growing interest in open methods.

Growth in open energy modelling 

Just two active open energy modelling projects were cited in a 2011 paper: OSeMOSYS and TEMOA.  Balmorel was also public at that time, having been made available on a website in 2001.
 the openmod wiki lists 24 such undertakings.
 the Open Energy Platform lists 17open energy frameworks and about 50open energy models.

Academic literature 

This 2012 paper presents the case for using "open, publicly accessible software and data as well as crowdsourcing techniques to develop robust energy analysis tools".  The paper claims that these techniques can produce high-quality results and are particularly relevant for developing countries.

There is an increasing call for the energy models and datasets used for energy policy analysis and advice to be made public in the interests of transparency and quality.  A 2010 paper concerning energy efficiency modeling argues that "an open peer review process can greatly support model verification and validation, which are essential for model development".  One 2012 study argues that the source code and datasets used in such models should be placed under publicly accessible version control to enable third-parties to run and check specific models.  Another 2014 study argues that the public trust needed to underpin a rapid transition in energy systems can only be built through the use of transparent open-source energy models.  The UK TIMES project (UKTM) is open source, according to a 2014 presentation, because "energy modelling must be replicable and verifiable to be considered part of the scientific process" and because this fits with the "drive towards clarity and quality assurance in the provision of policy insights".  In 2016, the Deep Decarbonization Pathways Project (DDPP) is seeking to improve its modelling methodologies, a key motivation being "the intertwined goals of transparency, communicability and policy credibility."  A 2016 paper argues that model-based energy scenario studies, wishing to influence decision-makers in government and industry, must become more comprehensible and more transparent.  To these ends, the paper provides a checklist of transparency criteria that should be completed by modelers.  The authors note however that they "consider open source approaches to be an extreme case of transparency that does not automatically facilitate the comprehensibility of studies for policy advice."  An editorial from 2016 opines that closed energy models providing public policy support "are inconsistent with the open access movement [and]  funded research".  A 2017 paper lists the benefits of open data and models and the reasons that many projects nonetheless remain closed.  The paper makes a number of recommendations for projects wishing to transition to a more open approach.  The authors also conclude that, in terms of openness, energy research has lagged behind other fields, most notably physics, biotechnology, and medicine.  Moreover:

A one-page opinion piece in Nature News from 2017 advances the case for using open energy data and modeling to build public trust in policy analysis.  The article also argues that scientific journals have a responsibility to require that data and code be submitted alongside text for scrutiny, currently only Energy Economics makes this practice mandatory within the energy domain.

Copyright and open energy data 

Issues surrounding copyright remain at the forefront with regard to open energy data.  Most energy datasets are collated and published by official or semi-official sources, for example, national statistics offices, transmission system operators, and electricity market operators.  The doctrine of open data requires that these datasets be available under free licenses (such as ) or be in the public domain.  But most published energy datasets carry proprietary licenses, limiting their reuse in numerical and statistical models, open or otherwise.  Measures to enforce market transparency have not helped because the associated information is normally licensed to preclude downstream usage.  Recent transparency measures include the 2013 European energy market transparency regulation 543/2013 and a 2016 amendment to the German Energy Industry Act to establish a nation energy information platform, slated to launch on 1July 2017.  Energy databases may also be protected under general database law, irrespective of the copyright status of the information they hold.

The document provides a comprehensive account of the data issues faced by researchers engaged in open energy system modeling and energy market analysis and quoted extensively from a German legal opinion.

In May 2020, participants from the Open Energy Modelling Initiative made a further submission on the European strategy for data.  In mid2021, participants made two written submissions on a proposed Data Act  legislative work-in-progress intended primarily to improve public interest business-to-government (B2G) information transfers within the European Economic Area (EEA).  More specifically, the two Data Act submissions drew attention to restrictive but nonetheless compliant public disclosure reporting practices deployed by the European Energy Exchange (EEX).

Public policy support 

In May 2016, the European Union announced that "all scientific articles in Europe must be freely accessible as of 2020".  This is a step in the right direction, but the new policy makes no mention of open software and its importance to the scientific process.  In August 2016, the United States government announced a new federal source code policy which mandates that at least 20% of custom source code developed by or for any agency of the federal government be released as open-source software (OSS).  The US Department of Energy (DOE) is participating in the program.  The project is hosted on a dedicated website and subject to a three-year pilot.  Open-source campaigners are using the initiative to advocate that European governments adopt similar practices.  In 2017 the Free Software Foundation Europe (FSFE) issued a position paper calling for free software and open standards to be central to European science funding, including the flagship EU program Horizon2020.  The position paper focuses on open data and open data processing and the question of open modeling is not traversed perse.

Workshops 

The Open Energy Modelling Initiative participants take turns to host regular academic workshops.

The Open Energy Modelling Initiative also holds occasional specialist meetings.

See also 

 Crowdsourcing
 Energy modeling
 Energy system – the interpretation of the energy sector in system terms
 Free Software Foundation Europe – a non-profit organization advocating for free software in Europe
 Open data
 Open energy system models – a review of energy system models that are also open source
 Open energy system databases – database projects which collect, clean, and republish energy-related datasets

Notes

Further reading 

 GenerationR open science blog on the openmod community
 Introductory video on open energy system modeling using the python language as an example
 Introductory video on the Open Energy Outlook (OEO) project specific to the United States

External links 

Related to openmod

 Open Energy Modelling Initiative website
 Open Energy Modelling Initiative wiki
 Open Energy Modelling Initiative discussion forum
 Open Energy Modelling Initiative email list archive
 Open Energy Modelling Initiative YouTube channel
 Open Energy Modelling Initiative GitHub account
 Open Energy Modelling Initiative twitter feed

Open energy data

 Open Energy Platform – a collaborative versioned database for storing open energy system model datasets
  – a semantic wiki-site and database covering energy systems data worldwide
 Energypedia – a wiki-based collaborative knowledge exchange covering sustainable energy topics in developing countries
 Open Power System Data project – triggered by the work of the Open Energy Modelling Initiative
 OpenEI – a US-based open energy data portal

Similar initiatives

 soundsoftware.ac.uk – an open modelling community for acoustic and music software

Other

 REEEM – a scientific project modeling sustainable energy futures for Europe
 EERAdata – a project exploring FAIR energy data for Europe

References 

 

Economics models
Energy development
Energy models
Energy organizations
Energy policy
Free and open-source software organizations
Mathematical modeling
Open data
Open science
Simulation